The 2010–11 New Mexico Lobos men's basketball team represented the University of New Mexico as a member of the Mountain West Conference. The Lobos were coached by fourth-year head coach Steve Alford and played their home games at The Pit in Albuquerque, New Mexico.

The Lobos are 2–2 against ranked teams.

Recruiting

|-
| colspan="7" style="padding-left:10px;" | Overall Recruiting Rankings:
|}

Other arrivals

The Lobos also received 3 transfers for this season. Drew Gordon transferred from UCLA, Demetrius Walker transferred from ASU and Emmanuel Negedu from Tennessee.

Departures
The Lobos lost Senior Roman Martinez and freshman Darington Hobson, both averaged over 14 points a game.

Coach Steve Alford Stays

Coach Steve Alford was rumored to be leaving after the 2009–10 season, the lobos were ranked #8 nationally and the 30–5 season was the best in school history. Coach Alford agreed to a contract that would keep him at UNM till the year 2020. "I want to be here as long as the University of New Mexico and the administration want me here," Alford said. "It's a big-time commitment on both ends, and this contract proves that."  UNM is 76–26 in Alford's three years.

Roster
Source:

Rankings

2010–11 Schedule
Source:
All times are Mountain

|-
!colspan=9 style=| Exhibition

|-
!colspan=9 style=| Regular season

|-
!colspan=9 style=| Mountain West tournament

|-
!colspan=9 style=| NIT

References

New Mexico Lobos men's basketball seasons
New Mexico
New Mexico
2010 in sports in New Mexico
2011 in sports in New Mexico